A harmonic is a wave with a frequency that is a positive integer multiple of the fundamental frequency, the frequency of the original periodic signal, such as a sinusoidal wave. The original signal is also called the 1st harmonic, the other harmonics are known as higher harmonics. As all harmonics are periodic at the fundamental frequency, the sum of harmonics is also periodic at that frequency. The set of harmonics forms a harmonic series.

The term is employed in various disciplines, including music, physics, acoustics, electronic power transmission, radio technology, and other fields. For example, if the fundamental frequency is 50 Hz, a common AC power supply frequency, the frequencies of the first three higher harmonics are 100 Hz (2nd harmonic), 150 Hz (3rd harmonic), 200 Hz (4th harmonic) and any addition of waves with these frequencies is periodic at 50 Hz.

In music, harmonics are used on string instruments and wind instruments as a way of producing sound on the instrument, particularly to play higher notes and, with strings, obtain notes that have a unique sound quality or "tone colour". On strings, bowed harmonics have a "glassy", pure tone. On stringed instruments, harmonics are played by touching (but not fully pressing down the string) at an exact point on the string while sounding the string (plucking, bowing, etc.); this allows the harmonic to sound, a pitch which is always higher than the fundamental frequency of the string.

Terminology
Harmonics may also be called "overtones", "partials" or "upper partials". The difference between "harmonic" and "overtone" is that the term "harmonic" includes all of the notes in a series, including the fundamental frequency (e.g., the open string of a guitar). The term "overtone" only includes the pitches above the fundamental. In some music contexts, the terms "harmonic", "overtone" and "partial" are used fairly interchangeably.

Characteristics

Most acoustic instruments emit complex tones containing many individual partials (component simple tones or sinusoidal waves), but the untrained human ear typically does not perceive those partials as separate phenomena. Rather, a musical note is perceived as one sound, the quality or timbre of that sound being a result of the relative strengths of the individual partials. Many acoustic oscillators, such as the human voice or a bowed violin string, produce complex tones that are more or less periodic, and thus are composed of partials that are near matches to integer multiples of the fundamental frequency and therefore resemble the ideal harmonics and are called "harmonic partials" or simply "harmonics" for convenience (although it's not strictly accurate to call a partial a harmonic, the first being real and the second being ideal).

Oscillators that produce harmonic partials behave somewhat like one-dimensional resonators, and are often long and thin, such as a guitar string or a column of air open at both ends (as with the modern orchestral transverse flute). Wind instruments whose air column is open at only one end, such as trumpets and clarinets, also produce partials resembling harmonics. However they only produce partials matching the odd harmonics, at least in theory. The reality of acoustic instruments is such that none of them behaves as perfectly as the somewhat simplified theoretical models would predict.

Partials whose frequencies are not integer multiples of the fundamental are referred to as inharmonic partials. Some acoustic instruments emit a mix of harmonic and inharmonic partials but still produce an effect on the ear of having a definite fundamental pitch, such as pianos, strings plucked pizzicato, vibraphones, marimbas, and certain pure-sounding bells or chimes. Antique singing bowls are known for producing multiple harmonic partials or multiphonics.

 Other oscillators, such as cymbals, drum heads, and other percussion instruments, naturally produce an abundance of inharmonic partials and do not imply any particular pitch, and therefore cannot be used melodically or harmonically in the same way other instruments can.

Dynamic tonality, building on the work of William Sethares, introduces the notion of pseudo-harmonic partials, in which the frequency of each partial is aligned to match the pitch of a corresponding note in a pseudo-Just tuning, thereby maximizing the consonance of that pseudo-harmonic timbre with notes of that pseudo-just tuning.

Partials, overtones, and harmonics

An overtone is any partial higher than the lowest partial in a compound tone. The relative strengths and frequency relationships of the component partials determine the timbre of an instrument. The similarity between the terms overtone and partial sometimes leads to their being loosely used interchangeably in a musical context, but they are counted differently, leading to some possible confusion. In the special case of instrumental timbres whose component partials closely match a harmonic series (such as with most strings and winds) rather than being inharmonic partials (such as with most pitched percussion instruments), it is also convenient to call the component partials "harmonics" but not strictly correct (because harmonics are numbered the same even when missing, while partials and overtones are only counted when present). This chart demonstrates how the three types of names (partial, overtone, and harmonic) are counted (assuming that the harmonics are present):

In many musical instruments, it is possible to play the upper harmonics without the fundamental note being present. In a simple case (e.g., recorder) this has the effect of making the note go up in pitch by an octave, but in more complex cases many other pitch variations are obtained. In some cases it also changes the timbre of the note. This is part of the normal method of obtaining higher notes in wind instruments, where it is called overblowing. The extended technique of playing multiphonics also produces harmonics. On string instruments it is possible to produce very pure sounding notes, called harmonics or flageolets by string players, which have an eerie quality, as well as being high in pitch. Harmonics may be used to check at a unison the tuning of strings that are not tuned to the unison. For example, lightly fingering the node found halfway down the highest string of a cello produces the same pitch as lightly fingering the node  of the way down the second highest string. For the human voice see Overtone singing, which uses harmonics.

While it is true that electronically produced periodic tones (e.g. square waves or other non-sinusoidal waves) have "harmonics" that are whole number multiples of the fundamental frequency, practical instruments do not all have this characteristic. For example, higher "harmonics"' of piano notes are not true harmonics but are "overtones" and can be very sharp, i.e. a higher frequency than given by a pure harmonic series. This is especially true of instruments other than stringed or brass/woodwind ones, e.g., xylophone, drums, bells etc., where not all the overtones have a simple whole number ratio with the fundamental frequency. The fundamental frequency is the reciprocal of the period of the periodic phenomenon.

On stringed instruments

The following table displays the stop points on a stringed instrument at which gentle touching of a string will force it into a harmonic mode when vibrated. String harmonics (flageolet tones) are described as having a "flutelike, silvery quality" that can be highly effective as a special color or tone color (timbre) when used and heard in orchestration. It is unusual to encounter natural harmonics higher than the fifth partial on any stringed instrument except the double bass, on account of its much longer strings.

Artificial harmonics

Occasionally a score will call for an artificial harmonic, produced by playing an overtone on an already stopped string. As a performance technique, it is accomplished by using two fingers on the fingerboard, the first to shorten the string to the desired fundamental, with the second touching the node corresponding to the appropriate harmonic.

Other information

Harmonics may be either used in or considered as the basis of just intonation systems. Composer Arnold Dreyblatt is able to bring out different harmonics on the single string of his modified double bass by slightly altering his unique bowing technique halfway between hitting and bowing the strings. Composer Lawrence Ball uses harmonics to generate music electronically.

See also

 Aristoxenus
 Electronic tuner
 Formant
 Fourier series
 Guitar harmonic
 Harmonic analysis
 Harmonics (electrical power)
 Harmonic generation
 Harmonic oscillator
 Harmony
 Pure tone
 Pythagorean tuning
 Scale of harmonics
 Spherical harmonics
 Stretched octave
 Subharmonic
 Xenharmonic music

References

External links
 The Feynman Lectures on Physics: Harmonics
 Harmonics, partials and overtones from fundamental frequency
 
 Harmonics
 Hear and see harmonics on a Piano

Acoustics
Guitar performance techniques
Telecommunications
String instruments
Sound